Stefanos Borbokis (born 1 September 1966) is a Greek former footballer. He is the brother of Vassilis Borbokis who also played for PAOK FC.

Club career
Borbokis began his career at PAOK FC in 1986 and became an influential part of the team playing 214 Alpha Ethniki games and scoring 32 goals. The 1987/88 season was by far his best season scoring 10 goals helping PAOK finish 3rd. That season he scored a goal in a 3–1 win against arch city rivals Aris FC, another goal in a 4–1 win against Panathinaikos and a double in a 6–1 win against Olympiakos (PAOK's biggest ever victory against the reds). The following 1988/89 season he scored a historic winner in PAOK's only ever win against Olympiakos (0-1) at the Athens Olympic Stadium. He also debuted in the UEFA Cup that season against Diego Maradona's Napoli FC, losing 2–1 on aggregate to the eventual 1988/89 Uefa Cup champions. In the 1991/92 Uefa Cup Borbokis scored the winner against K.V. Mechelen away in Belgium to progress 2–1 on aggregate to the second round. Borbokis also took part in the 1992 Greek Cup Final in which PAOK lost to Olympiakos FC over two legs 3–1.

In 1994, he transferred to Edessa where he played only one season, helping Edessaikos reach the final four in the Greek Cup. He later returned to Thessaloniki and played for Iraklis FC, Aris Thessaloniki F.C. and Apollon Kalamarias.

Borbokis is the only player to have ever played for all four major clubs of Thessaloniki.

International career
Borbokis earned his first cap with Greece as a 24th min substitute in a friendly against Northern Ireland on 17 February 1988, which Greece won 3–2. He is PAOK's 9th most capped Greek international having played 29 times. In the 1992 Euro Qualifiers he was Greece's top goal scorer with a tally of 3.

International goals

Personal life 

He hails from Mitrousi, Serres.

References

External links
 
 

1966 births
Living people
Footballers from Serres
Greek footballers
Super League Greece players
PAOK FC players
Iraklis Thessaloniki F.C. players
Aris Thessaloniki F.C. players
Apollon Pontou FC players
Edessaikos F.C. players
Greece international footballers
Greece under-21 international footballers
Association football forwards
Greek football managers
Thermaikos F.C. managers
Anagennisi Giannitsa F.C. managers
PAOK FC non-playing staff